West of Cheyenne may refer to:

 West of Cheyenne (1931 film), an American western film directed by Harry S. Webb
 West of Cheyenne (1938 film), an American western film directed by  Sam Nelson